Damon Gilbert Griffin (born June 14, 1976) is a former American football wide receiver in the National Football League. He was signed by the San Francisco 49ers as an undrafted free agent in 1999. He played college football at Oregon.

Griffin also played for the Cincinnati Bengals and St. Louis Rams.

References

1976 births
Living people
American football wide receivers
American football return specialists
Oregon Ducks football players
Cincinnati Bengals players
St. Louis Rams players